Casper R. Taylor Jr. (born December 19, 1934) served as Speaker of the Maryland House of Delegates from 1994–2003, among the longest Speaker's tenures in Maryland history.

Education
Taylor graduated from the University of Notre Dame in 1956, where he was a member of the Air Force ROTC.  He started out his career as a restaurant owner, and was first elected to the House of Delegates in 1974.

Career
Taylor is credited with helping to bring millions of dollars of state and private investments to the aid of his struggling district in Cumberland, including the state-backed Rocky Gap Lodge and Golf Resort. In the State House, Taylor authored many pieces of legislation over the course of his tenure, including the "One Maryland" bill, aimed at providing tax havens and other incentives for businesses to invest in depressed parts of the state.

Taylor was first elected to the House of Delegates for the 1975 legislative session to represent District 2A. In the 1994 election, he successfully ran as delegate for the newly created District 1C.

Taylor served until 2003 after losing his seat in the 2002 election.  His loss is generally attributed to redrawn legislative district lines that added four heavily Republican precincts in Washington County to his traditionally Democratic district based around Cumberland, and his support for some gun control laws, which were unpopular in the rural parts of his district.

He has received numerous awards, including the Legislator Recognition Award from the Maryland Association of Counties in 1994 and 2001. He was awarded an Honorary Doctor of Humane Letters from the College of Notre Dame in 2001, Frostburg State University in 2000, and Villa Julie College in 1995. He received the First Citizen Award from the Maryland Senate in 2003 and the Thomas Kennedy Award from the Maryland House of Delegates in 2004.

In January 2007, the new House of Delegates office building in Annapolis was named after Taylor. In June 2003, Taylor became a lobbyist and government relations consultant for the Alexander and Cleaver firm in Annapolis, MD.

Election results
2002 Race for Maryland House of Delegates – District 01C
Voters to choose one:
{| class="wikitable"
|-
!Name
!Votes
!Percent
!Outcome
|-
|-
|LeRoy E. Myers Jr., Rep.
|5,657
|  50.3%
|   Won
|-
|-
|Casper R. Taylor, Dem.
|5,581
|  49.6%
|   Lost
|}

1998 Race for Maryland House of Delegates – District 01C
Voters to choose one:
{| class="wikitable"
|-
!Name
!Votes
!Percent
!Outcome
|-
|-
|Casper R. Taylor Jr., Dem.
|6,205
|  70%
|   Won
|-
|-
|Eileen Brinker Steele, Rep.
|2,648
|  30%
|   Lost
|}

1994 Race for Maryland House of Delegates – District 01C
Voters to choose one:
{| class="wikitable"
|-
!Name
!Votes
!Percent
!Outcome
|-
|-
|Casper R. Taylor Jr., Dem.
|5,928
|  100%
|   Won
|}

1990 Race for Maryland House of Delegates – District 2A
Voters to choose one:
{| class="wikitable"
|-
!Name
!Votes
!Percent
!Outcome
|-
|-
|Casper R. Taylor Jr., Dem.
|4,116
|  65%
|   Won
|-
|-
|Robert L. Lewis, Rep.
|2,194
|  35%
|   Lost
|}

1986 Race for Maryland House of Delegates – District 2A
Voters to choose one:
{| class="wikitable"
|-
!Name
!Votes
!Percent
!Outcome
|-
|-
|Casper R. Taylor Jr., Dem.
|3,533
|  59%
|   Won
|-
|-
|James M. Roby, Rep.
|2,431
|  41%
|   Lost
|}

Citations

References
 
 

People from Frostburg, Maryland
Speakers of the Maryland House of Delegates
1934 births
Living people
Politicians from Cumberland, Maryland
University of Notre Dame alumni